Thermococcus hydrothermalis is a hyperthermophilic archaeon. It is strictly anaerobic and coccus-shaped, and its cells range from 0.8 to 2.0 μm in diameter, with type strain AL662T. It was isolated from a hydrothermal vent in the East Pacific Rise. This species is notable for its α-glucosidase, which functions optimally at a temperature of 110 °C.

References

Further reading

Erra-Pujada, Marta, et al. "The type II pullulanase of Thermococcus hydrothermalis: molecular characterization of the gene and expression of the catalytic domain." Journal of Bacteriology 181.10 (1999): 3284–3287.
Postec, Anne, et al. "Optimisation of growth conditions for continuous culture of the hyperthermophilic archaeon Thermococcus hydrothermalis and development of sulphur-free defined and minimal media." Research in microbiology 156.1 (2005): 82–87.

External links

LPSN

Archaea described in 1997
Euryarchaeota